Victoria Square is the name of the area and road that runs around the edge of the grounds of St Mary's Cathedral in Perth, Western Australia.

It is the northern extension of Victoria Avenue.

The area was originally named Church Hill by John Septimus Roe in 1839 or 1840, but was subsequently known as Victoria Square. The Anglicans of Perth chose the location of their cathedral, St George's, closer to Government House on St Georges Terrace, allowing the Catholic church to utilise Victoria Square.

The precinct that surrounds the area includes historic schools, Catholic Church buildings, as well as historic residential buildings.

Most of the historic buildings in the square were constructed and opened in the late nineteenth century.

Royal Perth Hospital is on its northern side, and related buildings are on the north west side of the square, while on the south east side is Mercedes College. 
In the nineteenth century, the Convent of Mercy was located on the square.

On the southern and south west part of the square is the Catholic Archbishop's Palace.

The road that leads to the square from the west is Murray Street, while the road leading east is Goderich Street. Lord Street runs from the north east corner of the square, and over Wellington Street and the railway line into Mount Lawley.

Intersections
Victoria Square is a circular one-way road, travelling anticlockwise, which is reflected in the table below.

See also
 List of streets in Perth

References

 
Streets in Perth central business district, Western Australia
Victoria Avenue, Perth